Lesley Lopez is an American politician who was elected to the Maryland House of Delegates in the 2018 Maryland General Assembly election. With Kirill Reznik and Gabriel Acevero, she represents the 39th House District as a member of the Democratic Party.

Early life and education 

The oldest of three siblings, Lopez was born overseas while her mother Patricia was serving on active duty in the U.S. Navy. She grew up in Southern California in a blended family. As a child she was adopted by her stepfather, Emsley Lopez, also a naval officer. Her paternal grandparents migrated to the United States from the Philippines.

Lopez earned a B.A. in Political Science at the University of California, San Diego, and an M.P.A. in Management at George Washington University.

Early career 

Lopez has worked as a journalist, a legislative staffer, and an educator. After graduation, she worked as an intern at the Washington Business Journal, and later as a production assistant for America's Most Wanted. From 2006 to 2010 she worked in Washington, D.C. as a producer for the European press corps and the BBC. She also worked on the production team for ABC's This Week with George Stephanopoulos.

From 2010 to 2011, she worked as press secretary for Texas Congressman Henry Cuellar. It was while working with immigrant families in Cuellar's district that she became seriously interested in politics. From 2011 to 2013, she served as Communications Director for the Congressional Hispanic Caucus under Reps. Charlie Gonzalez and Rubén Hinojosa. In that capacity she helped pass an immigration reform bill through the U.S. Senate and reauthorize the Violence Against Women Act, which was expanded to include protections for undocumented immigrants.

Over the next several years she served as Communications Director for the National Immigration Forum, the Democratic Legislative Campaign Committee, and the US-China Business Council. Since 2013, she has also taught Advanced Writing as an adjunct professor at George Washington University.

Maryland Legislature

When Delegate Charles E. Barkley announced in 2017 that he was leaving the General Assembly, state senator Nancy J. King and the other District 39 delegates tapped Lopez to replace him. In an interview, Lopez said she was motivated to run for office, in part, by the disrespectful way women candidates were being treated, and the fact that it took Maryland Delegate Kathleen M. Dumais ten years to pass legislation terminating the parental rights of rapists: "It was clear that representation is an issue, and we can't take representation for granted." She was endorsed by Career Firefighters, the League of Conservation Voters, the Sierra Club, NARAL, and the National Organization for Women. She was elected on November 6, 2018.

Lopez sits on the House Judiciary Committee of the Maryland legislature, serving in the Juvenile Law and Public Safety subcommittees. She is a member of the Montgomery County Delegation and the women's legislative caucus, and an associate member of the Latino caucus.

During her first session as delegate, Lopez successfully introduced bills on school bus safety and combating child pornography. She also chaired the working group on gun bills, and helped secure funding for a number of projects in and around the district.

Other memberships

Lopez is a member of SEIU Local 500. She serves on the Montgomery County Board of Social Services, the NARAL Pro-Choice America board, and the YWCA board, and is a National Volunteer Partner of the Girl Scouts of the USA.

References

External links
 

1983 births
American politicians of Filipino descent
American women of Filipino descent in politics
Living people
Democratic Party members of the Maryland House of Delegates
Women state legislators in Maryland
21st-century American politicians
University of California, San Diego alumni
Trachtenberg School of Public Policy & Public Administration alumni
21st-century American women politicians